Samantha Harvey may refer to:

 Samantha Harvey (author) (born 1975), English author
 Samantha Harvey (singer), British pop singer
 Samantha Harvey (pentathlete) (born 1972), Brazilian modern pentathlete